Baseball at the 1959 Pan American Games was contested between nine teams. The 1959 edition was the first Pan American Games held in the United States and the third overall. Games were held at Comiskey Park and Wrigley Field in Chicago from August 27 through September 7. This remains the only Pan American Games baseball championship won by Venezuela.

Team summaries
 went 6–1 to claim the title. The team was managed by José Antonio Casanova and featured future big leaguer Dámaso Blanco. Infielder José Flores led the event with three triples while Enrique Capecchi was 2-0 pitching against Brazil and the US, also Manuel Pérez Bolaños was 2-0 on the mound, as well as 18-year-old Luis Peñalver, about to embark on a 19-year Minor League career, mostly in AAA.

 won Silver, thanks to a 5–1 record. Irmo Figueroa led the competition in average (.500) while Carlos Pizarro had the most hits (12). R. Vazquez led in RBI (10) and tied for the home run lead with 2.

 won Bronze at 4–3; their 3–2 win over Cuba helped them lock up the Medal. An A. Hall, presumably Alan Hall, tied for the homer lead with two. Charles Davis had the best ERA (0.69). Future Hall Of Famer Lou Brock was 1-for-10. Another future major leaguer was outfielder Ty Cline. Third baseman Jack McCartan later won a gold medal as the goaltender for the United States hockey team at the 1960 Winter Olympics.

 had a very disappointing tourney, going 2–4 and failing to take a medal, a contrast with the upcoming state-sponsored Fidel Castro era teams that breached the amateur code and won 10 Pan Am Games Gold Medals in a row. Urbano Gonzalez hit .353 and Pedro Chavez was 5-for-9.

 was 5th at 3–2. Roberto Coto led the event with 5 doubles. Mauro Ruiz went 2–0, the only non-Venezuelan to post that record.

 had one of their best events ever, going 3–3 to finish 6th.

Final standing

Medalists

References

 

1959
Events at the 1959 Pan American Games
Pan American Games
1959 Pan American Games
1959 Pan American Games